The Feverfew is an American band based in Brooklyn, New York, United States, known for their challenging lyrics, complex harmonies, and stark acoustic sound.  The band has been compared to Red House Painters, Cat Power, and Mazzy Star.

History
Bethany Walk-Spiers, formerly of the bands Sleep Station and Morgan Storm, formed The Feverfew in 2003, mainly as a vehicle for her new solo material.  Officially, the band consisted of Spiers and Jonathon Linaberry, but several other musicians contributed to the band's first album, 2004's Apparitions, released by Eyeball Records.

Members
Bethany Walk-Spiers: vocals, guitar
Jonathon Linaberry: guitar, melodica, backing vocals

Discography

Apparitions, 2004

Track listing
"Goodbye, Blue Monday"
"Selby"
"By Now"
"The Night The Whole World Caught On Fire"
"Perfect Ugly Amateur"
"Descending"
"Last Call"
"A Song, A Story"
"The Gift"

References

External links
  Eyeball Records

American folk musical groups
Musical groups from Brooklyn
Musical groups established in 2003